, nicknamed Nomoken,  is a Japanese professional basketball player who plays for the Gunma Crane Thunders of the B.League in Japan. The small forward also represented the Japan national basketball team in 2014 and 2016. He tested positive for the coronavirus on November 24, 2020.

FIBA Events Stats

|-
| style="text-align:left;"| 2009-10
| style="text-align:left;"| Japan U18
| 6 ||  ||33.30  || .313 ||.385  || .588|| 3.3 || 1.2|| 1.2 || 0.7|| 11.2
|-
|}

Non-FIBA Events Stats

|-
| style="text-align:left;"| 2013
| style="text-align:left;"| Universiade
| 8 ||  ||20.20  || .447 ||.500  || .650|| 2.9 ||1.1 || 0.6 || 0.0|| 7.4
|-
| style="text-align:left;"| 2015
| style="text-align:left;"| Universiade
| 8 ||  || 19.28 || .367 || .091 || .684|| 3.0 ||1.0  ||0.6 || 0.4 || 6.2
|-
|}

Career statistics

Regular season 

|-
| align="left" | 2014-15
| align="left" | Toshiba
| 7 || 0 || 7.9 || 21.1 || 25.0 || 75.0 || 1.3 || 0.1 || 0.4 || 1.0 ||  2.3
|-
| align="left"  style="background-color:#afe6ba; border: 1px solid gray" | 2015-16†
| align="left" | Toshiba
| 39 || 8 || 10.1 || 38.5 || 14.3 || 76.2 || 1.2|| 0.5 || 0.4|| 1.0|| 2.4
|-
| align="left" | 2016-17
| align="left" | Kawasaki
| 54 ||  || 9.5 ||52.8  || 0.0 ||58.5 ||1.6 || 0.5 || 0.2 || 0.1 || 3.0
|-
| align="left" | 2017-18
| align="left" | Kawasaki
|56||  || 8.0 ||37.0 || 0.0||55.3 ||1.2  || 0.8 || 0.2 || 0.1 || 1.8
|-
| align="left" | 2018-19
| align="left" | Akita
| 60 ||8  || 10.5 ||45.5 || 0.0 ||56.1 ||1.9 || 0.6 || 0.4   || 0.1 || 2.8
|-
| align="left" | 2019-20
| align="left" | Akita
| 41 ||9  || 13.2 ||40.1 || 14.3 ||65.2 ||2.0 || 1.1 || 0.7   || 0.1 ||  3.4 
|-
| align="left" | 2020-21
| align="left" | Akita
| 58 ||4  || 14.6 ||.446 || .263 ||.606 ||2.8 || 1.2 || 0.4  || 0.1 ||  3.5 
|-
|}

Playoffs 

|-
|style="text-align:left;"|2014-15
|style="text-align:left;"|Toshiba
| 2 ||   || 9.0 || .333 || .500 || .000 || 0.5 || 0.0|| 0.0 || 0.0 || 3.0
|-
|style="text-align:left;"|2015-16
|style="text-align:left;"|Toshiba
| 3 ||   || 3.3 || .000 || .000 || .500 || 0.0 || 0.0|| 0.0 || 0.0 || 0.3
|-
|style="text-align:left;"|2016-17
|style="text-align:left;"|Kawasaki
| 5 || 0 || 7:34 || .500 || .000 || .000 || 1.4 || 0.2|| 0 || 0 || 2.8
|-
|style="text-align:left;"|2017-18
|style="text-align:left;"|Kawasaki
| 2 || 0 || 1:17 || .000 || .000 || .000 || 0.5 || 0|| 0 || 0 || 0
|-

Early cup games 

|-
|style="text-align:left;"|2017
|style="text-align:left;"|Kawasaki
| 2 || 2 || 28:00 || .563 || .000 || .500 || 5.5 || 2.5 || 1.0 || 0.5 || 9.5
|-
|style="text-align:left;"|2018
|style="text-align:left;"|Akita
|2 || 0 || 24:40 || .231 || .000 || .750 || 3.5 || 2.0 || 1.0 || 0.0 || 4.5
|-
|style="text-align:left;"|2019
|style="text-align:left;"|Akita
|2 || 0 || 25:04 || .375 || .000 || .000 || 1.0 || 4.0 || 2.0 || 0.0 || 6.0
|-

Preseason games

|-
| align="left" |2018
| align="left" | Akita
| 2 || 0 || 9.3 || .000 ||.000  || .500||2.5 || 1.0|| 0.5|| 0.0 ||  0.5
|-
| align="left" |2019
| align="left" | Akita
| 3 || 1 || 15.1 || .500 ||.000  || .833||2.3 || 1.7|| 1.7|| 0.0 ||  5.67
|-

Source: Changwon1Changwon2
Source: UtsunomiyaToyamaSendai

William Jones Cup

|-
| align="left" |  2014
| align="left" | Japan
|5|| ||5|| .222|| .000|| .600|| 0.8||0.2 || 0.4|| 0.0|| 1.4
|-
| align="left" |  2016
| align="left" | Japan
|7|| ||14|| .300|| 1.000|| .750|| 2.7||0.4 || 0.0|| 0.0|| 2.3
|-
| align="left" |  2017
| align="left" | Japan
|7|| ||20|| .450|| .000|| .680|| 4.6||1.0 || 0.3|| 0.3|| 7.6
|-
|- class="sortbottom"
! style="text-align:center;" colspan=2| Career 
! 19 ||  || 14 || .377 || .250 || .677 || 2.9 || 0.6|| 0.2 ||0.1 || 4.0
|-

Trivia

His favorite quote is "Nanakorobi Yaoki", meaning "seven times down, eight times up like a daruma doll".
He ate 1,300 grams of rice a day at Kawasaki.

References

External links
Stats
Nomoto with Kawasaki

1992 births
Living people
Akita Northern Happinets players
Japanese men's basketball players
Kawasaki Brave Thunders players
Sportspeople from Hyōgo Prefecture
Sportspeople from Amagasaki
Small forwards